Artur Andrzej Pollok (born 7 April 1972 in Kraków) is a Polish economist who serves as an permanent representative to the FAO, WFP, IFAD in Rome (since 2016).

Life 

Pollok in 1991 graduated from economic high school in Kraków. The same year he won the national Economic Knowledge Contest. Between 1991 and 1996 he was studying banking and finance, specialisation: banking, at the Kraków Academy of Economics, receiving a master's degree. He was studying also about Pope John Paul II life and philosophy at the Tischner European University in Kraków. In 2005, he defended his Ph.D. thesis in economics.

In 1995, while still being a student, he began his professional career as an assistant at the Department of Microeconomics, Faculty of Finance of the Kraków Academy of Economics. Following years, he was promoted to the post of assistant professor.

In 1996, Pollok became an ordinary member of the Polish Economic Society, from 2005 to 2015 being its vice president and secretary of the Branch Board in Kraków. From 1995 to 2015 he was member of the Economic Knowledge Contest Head Committee, since 2004 deputy head of the committee.

In 2016 he was appointed the Permanent Representative of Poland to the Food and Agriculture Organization, the World Food Programme, and the International Fund for Agricultural Development in Rome.

In February 2023, he was elected President of World Food Programme Executive Board.

Besides Polish, he speaks English, Italian and Russian languages. He is married to Katarzyna Dagmara Pollok, with two daughters.

Honours 

 2007 – Medal of the National Education Commission
 2007 – Bronze Cross of Merit
 2011 – Silver Cross of Merit

References 

1972 births
Living people
Diplomats from Kraków
Kraków University of Economics alumni
Academic staff of the Kraków University of Economics
Permanent Representatives of Poland to the United Nations
Polish economists
Recipients of the Bronze Cross of Merit (Poland)
Recipients of the Silver Cross of Merit (Poland)